Merciless, born Leonard Bartley July 1st, 1971 in the Turner district of Chapelton, Clarendon, Jamaica,was a Jamaican dancehall and reggae artist.He  died on July 19th, 2022 in St. Andrew, Jamaica.

Biography
Merciless first found success performing with sound systems. He made his recording début in 1994 with "Lend Out Mi Mercy", which was a hit in Jamaica and elsewhere, and a string of further hits followed, including "Mavis", which was the top reggae single in Jamaica in 1995 and used the same riddim as Shaggy's "Mr. Boombastic". Like several other dancehall stars, he adopted 'conscious' lyrical content in the late 1990s. He is similar in sound to fellow artist Bounty Killer. In the late 2000s he was imprisoned in Florida for fourteen months.

He is also known by the nickname "Warhead", and engaged in several high-profile on-stage 'battles' in the late 1990s and 2000s with fellow deejays Beenie Man, Ninjaman, and Bounty Killer. His rivalry with Bounty Killer did not prevent the two from recording together, with "No One Cares" released in 2000.

Discography
Mr. Merciless (1994), VP Records
Len' Out Mi Mercy (1995), Annex
Mama's Cooking (1997), Greensleeves Records

References

1971 births
Living people
People from Clarendon Parish, Jamaica
Jamaican DJs